Alessandro Alessandri also known as Alexander ab Alexandro (1461–1523) was a Neapolitan lawyer of great learning, who flourished towards the end of the fifteenth and beginning of the sixteenth century, was descended of the ancient and noble family of the Alexandri of Naples.

He was born according to some, in 1461. He followed the profession of the law, first at Naples, and afterwards at Rome; but devoted all the time he could spare to the study of polite literature; and at length entirely left the bar, from scruples of conscience respecting the practice of the law, that he might lead a more easy and agreeable life with the muses. “When I saw,” says he, “that the counsellors could not defend nor assist any one against the power or favour of the mighty, I said it was in vain we took so much pains, and fatigued ourselves with so much study in controversies of law, and with learning such a variety of cases so exactly reported, when I saw the judgments passed according to the temerity of every remiss and corrupt person who presided over the laws, and gave determinations not according to equity, but favour and affection.”

The particulars of his life are to be gathered from his work entitled “Genialium Dierum:” It appears by it that he lodged at Rome in a house that was haunted; and he relates many surprising particulars about the ghost, which show him to have been credulous, although perhaps not more so than his contemporaries. He says also, that when he was very young, he went to the lectures of Philetphus, who explained at Rome the Tusculan questions of Cicero; he was there also when Nicholas Perot and Domitius Calderinus read their public lectures upon Martial. Some say that he acted as prothonotary of the kingdom of Naples, and that he discharged the office with great honour; but this is not mentioned in his work.

Apostolo Zeno fixes his death in 1523, and it is generally agreed that he died at Rome, aged about sixty-two. His work, the “Genialium Dirrum,” is a miscellany of learning and philology, somewhat on the model of the “Noctes Atticae” of Aulus Gellius. The first edition was printed at Rome, 1522, fol. under the title of “Alexandri de Alexandro dies Geniales.” Andrew-Tiraqueau bestowed a commentary on it, entitled “Semestria,” Lyons, 1586, fol. Notes have also been added to it by Christopher Colerus, and Dennis Gotefrid, or Godfrey, which were printed with Tiraqueau’s commentary, Francfort, 1594, fol. The edition of Paris, 1582, is held in estimation, but the best is that of Leyden, 1675, 2 vols. 8vo. There is another work of his, published before the Genialium Dierum, but afterwards incorporated with it, entitled “Alexandri J. C. Napolitani Dissertationes quatuor de rebus admirundis, &c.” Rome, 4to, without date, or printer’s name. Mr. Roscoe, who has introduced him in his life of Leo as a member of the academy of Naples, says that his works prove him to have been a man of extensive reading, great industry, and of a considerable share of critical ability, and perhaps as little tinctured with superstition as most of the writers of the age in which he lived.

Notes

Further reading

1461 births
15th-century Italian nobility
15th-century Italian jurists
15th-century Neapolitan people
1523 deaths
16th-century Italian jurists
16th-century Neapolitan people